Valley University of Science and Technology (VUST), is a private university in Uganda. In October 2015, the proprietors of the university received accreditation from the Uganda National Council for Higher Education, to start the institution.

Location
The geographical coordinates of the university campus are: 0°32'54.0"S, 30°12'04.0"E (Latitude:-0.548333; Longitude:30.201111).

Overview
VUST is an institutional of higher learning that received accreditation in October 2015 to begin with two faculties. The university is wholly owned by an entity known as Mukaira Foundation Limited (MFL). MFL also owns and operates Valley College, a mixed residential secondary school, and Valley Wines Limited, a wine-growing and processing business. MFL is majority owned by businessman and retired educator, William Mukaira (born 1929)

The university aims to provide science and technology courses applicable to the rural environment, in a rural setting, with a view to improve the living conditions of the rural communities in the areas that the university serves.

Academics
The university has two faculties: (a) Faculty of Science,  Technology & Innovations and (b) Faculty of Business and Management Science.

Courses
 Faculty of Science, Technology & Innovations
 Bachelor of Agribusiness Management and Rural Development
 Bachelor of Science in Agro-processing Technology
 Bachelor of Science in Food and Wine Production Systems
 Bachelor of Information Technology
 Bachelor of Science in Tourism and Hospitality
 Diploma in Agribusiness and Rural Development
 Diploma in Information Technology
 National Certificate in Information Technology
 Certificate in Secretarial and Information Management
 Certificate in Agribusiness and Rural Development
 Certificate in Computer Science and Technology
 Certificate in Computer Applications
 Certificate in Library Information Science

 Faculty of Education
 Master`s degree in Education Management Science and Leadership
 Bachelor of Arts with Education
 Bachelor of Science in Guidance and Counseling
 Bachelor of Education (Secondary) (In-service)
 Bachelor of Education (Primary) (In-service)
 Postgraduate Diploma in Education Management Science and Leadership
 Diploma in Early childhood Education
 Diploma in Primary Education (In-service)

 Faculty of Business and Management Science
 Bachelor of Economic and Management Science
 Bachelor of Business Administration
 Bachelor of Office Management and Secretarial Studies
 Bachelor of Public Administration
 Bachelor of Procurement and Logistics
 Diploma in Business Administration

See also
List of universities in Uganda
Education in Uganda

References

External links
Website of Valley University of Science and Technology
Courses Offered At Valley University of Science and Technology

Universities and colleges in Uganda
Bushenyi District
Educational institutions established in 2016
Western Region, Uganda
2016 establishments in Uganda